The Cheylesmore Memorial is a Grade II listed outdoor stone memorial dedicated to British Army officer Herbert Eaton, 3rd Baron Cheylesmore, located in the Victoria Embankment Gardens in Westminster, London, England. The memorial was designed by Edwin Lutyens and unveiled in 1930.

At the dedication ceremony on 17 July 1930, the memorial was unveiled by Prince Arthur, Duke of Connaught and Strathearn, the third son of Queen Victoria. Those attending included John Jellicoe, 1st Earl Jellicoe and Paul Methuen, 3rd Baron Methuen.

The memorial is made of Portland stone and has seats backing on to a decorative screen facing a small pond. An inscription at the centre of the screen reads:

References

External links

1930 establishments in England
1930 sculptures
Grade II listed buildings in the City of Westminster
Grade II listed monuments and memorials
Military memorials in London
Monuments and memorials in London
Victoria Embankment
Works of Edwin Lutyens in England